Danielle Etrasco (born July 31, 1991) is an American women’s lacrosse player. 
Having played with the Boston University Terriers at the collegiate level, she was named to the US national team for the 2011-12 season. In 2016, she was selected by the Boston Storm with their seventh pick overall in the inaugural United Women's Lacrosse League Draft.

Playing career
At Massapequa High School, she earned All-American honors following her senior season. She would also play for the Liberty Lacrosse club team.

NCAA
During her junior season (2012), Etrasco’s 58 goals, 80 points and 49 draw controls paced all players on the Terriers. Etrasco would lead the team again in all three statistical categories in her final season. One of the tri-captains for both the 2012 and 2013 campaigns, she improved her goal total to 59 in her senior season, while also emerging as the team leader in assists with 20. In addition, she registered at least one point in every game. Of note, she would graduate with career totals of 248 points and 192 goals, respectively.

USA Lacrosse

Having first joined the US national team in 2011, Etrasco was part of the gold medal winning US roster at the 2013 Women's Lacrosse World Cup, held in Oshawa, Ontario, Canada. In seven tournament games, Etrasco would score 17 goals while logging three assists.

UWLX
Etrasco would score at least one goal in each of the first two games in Boston Storm franchise history.

Coaching career
After graduating from Boston University, Etrasco spent the 2013-14 academic year on the coaching staff at Virginia Tech. Working on the team’s attack, she helped the team improve its goal scoring output by 15 goals. 

In July 2014, Etrasco was named an assistant coach to Kristen Waagbo with Army’s women’s lacrosse team.

Awards and honors
2010 America East All-Rookie Team
2011 America East Co-Player of the Year 
2011-13 All-America East Conference
2011-13 IWLCA Northeast All-Region first team 
2012 IWLCA All-American third team 
2013 IWLCA All-American second team
2013 Tewaaraton Award nominee

References

1989 births
Living people
Lacrosse players from New York (state)
People from Massapequa, New York
Boston University Terriers women's lacrosse players
Lacrosse forwards
Sportspeople from Nassau County, New York
Virginia Tech Hokies coaches
Army Black Knights women's lacrosse coaches
Georgetown Hoyas women's lacrosse coaches